The Virat Hindustan Sangam is an Indian right-wing cultural organisation. It was founded by Subramanian Swamy on 8 April 2015. Its stated objective is "to pave way for a Hindu Renaissance based on the concepts of Sanatana Dharma". It was established to push issues like building Ram Mandir, scrapping Article 370 and bringing Uniform Civil Code.

Sri Lankan politician Mahinda Rajapaksa had also addressed an event organised by VHS in 2018, where he said that war of 2009 was against terrorism and not against the Tamil community.

References 

Organizations established in 2015
Hindu organizations
Hindu organisations based in India
Right-wing populism in India
Hindutva
Hindu nationalism
Hindu movements
2015 establishments in India
Hindu new religious movements